The economic history of China describes the changes and developments in China's economy from the founding of the People's Republic of China (PRC) in 1949 to the present day.

China has been the fastest growing economy in the world since the 1980s, with an average annual growth rate of 10% from 1978 to 2005, based on government statistics. Its GDP reached $USD 2.286 trillion in 2005. Since the end of the Maoist period in 1978, China has been transitioning from a state dominated planned socialist economy to a mixed economy. This transformation required a complex number of reforms in China's fiscal, financial, enterprise, governance and legal systems and the ability for the government to be able to flexibly respond to the unintended consequences of these changes. This transformation has been accompanied by high levels of industrialization and urbanization, a process that has influenced every aspect of China's society, culture and economy.

The large size of China means there are major regional variations in living standards that can vary from extreme poverty to relative prosperity. In much of rural China, peasants live off the land, while in major cities like Shanghai and Beijing a modern service-based economy is forming.

Since the PRC was founded in 1949, China has experienced a surprising and turbulent economic development process. It has experienced revolution, socialism, Maoism, and finally the gradual economic reform and fast economic growth that has characterized the post-Maoist period. The period of the Great Leap Forward famine and the chaos of the Cultural Revolution negatively impacted the economy. However, since the period of economic reform began in 1978, China has seen major improvements in average living standards and has experienced relative social stability. In that period, China has evolved from an isolated socialist state into a backbone of the world economy.

The high growth rates of the reform period were caused by the massive mobilization of resources, and the shift of control of those resources from public to private ownership which allowed for improved efficiency in the management of those resources. The benefits reaped from this era of massive resource mobilization are now coming to an end and China must rely more on efficiency improvements in the future to further grow its economy.

Economic policies, 1949–1989

When the Chinese Communist Party (CCP) came to power in 1949, its leaders' fundamental long-range goals were to transform China into a modern, powerful, socialist nation. In economic terms these objectives meant industrialization, improvement of living standards, narrowing of income differences, and production of modern military equipment. As the years passed, the leadership continued to subscribe to these goals. But the economic policies formulated to achieve them were dramatically altered on several occasions in response to major changes in the economy, internal politics, and international political and economic developments.

Recovery from war, 1949–52
In 1949 China's economy was suffering from the debilitating effects of decades of warfare. Many mines and factories had been damaged or destroyed. At the end of the war with Japan in 1945, Soviet troops had dismantled about half the machinery in the major industrial areas of the northeast and shipped it to the Soviet Union. Transportation, communication, and power systems had been destroyed or had deteriorated because of lack of maintenance. Agriculture was disrupted, and food production was some 30 percent below its pre-war peak level. Further, economic ills were compounded by one of the most virulent inflation's in world history.

As the Nationalists fled during their defeat in the Chinese Civil War, they stripped China of liquid assets including gold, silver, and the country's dollar reserves. Nationalists forces also attempted to firebomb industrial sites, but workers were able to stop them at many such locations. By the time the Nationalists were defeated, commerce had been destroyed, the national currency rendered valueless, and the economy was based on barter.

The chief goal of the government for the 1949–52 period was simply to restore the economy to normal working order. The administration moved quickly to repair transportation and communication links and revive the flow of economic activity. The banking system was nationalized and centralized under the People's Bank of China. To bring inflation under control by 1951, the government unified the monetary system, tightened credit, restricted government budgets at all levels and put them under central control, and guaranteed the value of the currency. The CCP's success in overcoming hyperinflation and stabilizing prices became a major source of the new government's legitimacy.

Commerce was stimulated and partially regulated by the establishment of state trading agencies (commercial departments), which competed with private traders in purchasing goods from producers and selling them to consumers or enterprises. State trading agencies served as a mechanism for re-creating and integrating markets and through this process of re-integration between urban and rural economies helped stabilize the value of money.

Transformation of ownership in industry proceeded slowly. About a third of the country's enterprises had been under state control while the Nationalist government was in power (1927–49), as was much of the modernized transportation sector. The CCP immediately made these units state-owned enterprises upon taking power in 1949. The remaining privately owned enterprises were gradually brought under government control, but 17 percent of industrial units were still completely outside the state system in 1952.  As the industrial means of production were transferred to the state, conditions for workers improved. The growing number of state workers were entitled to permanent employment, an eight-hour day, medical benefits, subsidized food and housing, as well as an eight-grade wage scale that was consistent across different state owned enterprises.

Under a nationwide land reform movement, titles to about 45 percent of the arable land were redistributed from landlords and more prosperous farmers to the 60 to 70 percent of farm families that previously owned little or no land. The success of land reform meant that at the founding of the PRC in 1949, China could credibly claim that for the first time since the late Qing period that it had succeeded in feeding one fifth of the world's population with only 7% of the world's cultivable land. Once land reform was completed in an area, farmers were encouraged to cooperate in some phases of production through the formation of small "mutual aid teams" of six or seven households each. Thirty-eight percent of all farm households belonged to mutual aid teams in 1952. By 1952 price stability had been established, commerce had been restored, and industry and agriculture had regained their previous peak levels of production. By 1953, China had rapidly recovered its economy.

First Five-Year Plan, 1953–57
Having restored a viable economic base, the leadership under Mao Zedong, Zhou Enlai, and other revolutionary veterans was prepared to embark on an intensive program of industrial growth and socialization. For this purpose the administration adopted the Soviet economic model, based on state ownership in the modern sector, large collective units in agriculture, and centralized economic planning. The Soviet approach to economic development was manifested in the First Five-Year Plan (1953–57). As in the Soviet economy, the main objective was a high rate of economic growth, with primary emphasis on industrial development at the expense of agriculture and particular concentration on heavy industry and capital-intensive technology. Soviet planners helped their Chinese counterparts formulate the plan. Large numbers of Soviet engineers, technicians, and scientists assisted in developing and installing new heavy industrial facilities, including many entire plants and pieces of equipment purchased from the Soviet Union.

Government control over industry was increased during this period by applying financial pressures and inducements to convince owners of private, modern firms to sell them to the state or convert them into joint public-private enterprises under state control. China nationalized commerce, industry, and handicrafts over the period 1953 to 1956. By 1956 approximately 67.5 percent of all modern industrial enterprises were state owned, and 32.5 percent were under joint public-private ownership. No privately owned firms remained. Handicraft industries were organized into cooperatives, which accounted for 91.7 percent of all handicraft workers by 1956.

Agriculture underwent extensive organizational changes. In fall 1953, the CCP's Central Committee instituted a state monopoly in purchasing and marketing of grain (and other raw materials). This policy served to break the relationship between wealthy peasants and grain merchants, ending the ability to profit from speculation in grain.

To facilitate the mobilization of agricultural resources, improve the efficiency of farming, and increase government access to agricultural products, the authorities encouraged farmers to organize increasingly large and socialized collective units. This collectivization continued over the period 1955 to 1958. From the loosely structured, tiny mutual aid teams, villages were to advance first to lower-stage, agricultural producers' cooperatives, in which families still received some income on the basis of the amount of land they contributed, and eventually to advanced cooperatives, or collectives. In the advanced producers' cooperatives, income shares were based only on the amount of labor contributed. In addition, each family was allowed to retain a small private plot on which to grow vegetables, fruit, and livestock for its own use. The collectivization process began slowly but accelerated in 1955 and 1956. In 1957 about 93.5 percent of all farm households had joined advanced producers' cooperatives.

The industrial working class grew from 6 million to 10 million. Industrial work places organized as work units (danwei) provided subsidized housing, permanent jobs, education, and medical care. 

Throughout the 1950s, a major challenge for the large-scale economic modernization was the relative lack of managerial talent. Promotion of ordinary workers to management roles was intended to address this challenge while also serving the larger political goal of placing the proletariat in control.

Great Leap Forward, 1958–60

Before the end of the First Five-Year Plan, the growing imbalance between industrial and agricultural growth, dissatisfaction with inefficiency, and lack of flexibility in the decision-making process convinced the nation's leaders – particularly Mao Zedong – that the highly centralized, industry-based Soviet model was not appropriate for China. The income gap between rural and urban Chinese had widened. The situation was one Mao had begun to worry about before 1957, with his 1956 On the Ten Major Relationships identifying the important of "the relationship between heavy industry on one hand and light industry and agriculture on the other."

The Great Leap Forward's focus on total workforce mobilization resulted in opportunities for women's labor advancement. As women became increasingly needed to work in agriculture and industry, and encouraged by policy to do so, the phenomenon of Iron Women arose. Women did traditionally male work in both fields and factories, including major movements of women into management positions. Women competed for high productivity, and those who distinguished themselves came to be called Iron Women.

In the middle of the Second Five-Year Plan (i.e., in the early 1960s), the economy began to recover from the failures of the Great Leap Forward. China's development was accelerating, including with regard to the production of material goods. In the view of historian Maurice Meisner, this created a concern for Communist Party leadership: while rapid economic development and ideological transformation was necessary to release the productive energy of the masses, it also raised a risk that China could backslide into capitalism.

Cultural Revolution, 1966–76
The Cultural Revolution was set in motion by Mao Zedong in 1966 and called to a halt in 1968, but the atmosphere of radical leftism persisted until Mao's death and the fall of the Gang of Four in 1976. During this period, there were several distinct phases of economic policy.

Until the Cultural Revolution, China had paid dividends to the former capitalist class from the value of property that had been seized in the revolution. "A campaign during the Cultural Revolution ended this practice.".

Gang of Four, 1974–76
Mao's last years included a period of general economic disarray as a wave of strikes, factory slowdowns, and worker absenteeism arose in the majority of major industrial centers, accompanied by an increase in crime, including looting of state granaries. The rationing system expanded to cover more than 80 percent of staple items and consumer goods. However, by 1975 China's economy was performing well according to most conventional economic measures. Although the economy was not on the verge of collapse as some post-Mao historical narratives portray, it nonetheless faced pervasive economic difficulties caused by political instability and the consequences of China's develop mentalist model, which prioritized growth in industrial and military capacity rather than consumption.

Reform of the economic system, beginning in 1978

Despite political upheavals during the Mao era, China's GNP grew an average of 6.2% annually over the period 1952–1978. Industrialization during the Mao era resulted in the significant accumulation of both physical and human capital, which laid the foundation for China's successful reforms. The World Bank's first report on China assessed the Mao era positively, citing rapid growth and industrialization as well as the "virtual elimination of the worst aspects of poverty," although it also identified room for improvement.

Chinese reformers were more critical, however. For example, Hu Qiaomu's July 1978 report to the State Council, "Act in Accordance with Economic Laws," described the situation of the peasants during as grave and estimated that grain output had merely kept pace with population growth.

At the milestone Third Plenum of the National Party Congress's 11th Central Committee which opened on December 22, 1978, the party leaders decided to undertake a program of gradual but fundamental reform of the economic system. They concluded that the centrally planned economy had failed to produce efficient economic growth and had caused China to fall far behind not only the industrialized nations of the West but also the new industrial powers of Asia: Japan, South Korea, Singapore, Taiwan, and Hong Kong.

In the late 1970s, while Japan and Hong Kong rivaled European countries in modern technology, China's citizens had to make do with barely sufficient food supplies, rationed clothing, inadequate housing, and a service sector that was inadequate and inefficient. All of these shortcomings embarrassed China internationally.

The purpose of the reform program was not to abandon communism but to make it work better by substantially increasing the role of market mechanisms in the system and by reducing—not eliminating—government planning and direct control.

The process of reform was incremental. New measures were first introduced experimentally in a few localities and then were popularized and disseminated nationally if they proved successful.

The government resumed dividend payments to Chinese capitalists whose property had been seized after the revolution (the practice had been suspended as a result of a campaign during the Cultural Revolution), including with interest.

By 1987 the program had achieved remarkable results in increasing supplies of food and other consumer goods and had created a new climate of dynamism and opportunity in the economy. At the same time, however, the reforms also had created new problems and tensions, leading to intense questioning and political struggles over the program's future.

Period of readjustment, 1979–81
The first few years of the reform program were designated the "period of readjustment," during which key imbalances in the economy were to be corrected and a foundation was to be laid for a well-planned modernization drive. The schedule of Hua Guofeng's ten-year plan was discarded, although many of its elements were retained.

The major goals of the readjustment process were to expand exports rapidly; overcome key deficiencies in transportation, communications, coal, iron, steel, building materials, and electric power; and redress the imbalance between light and heavy industry by increasing the growth rate of light industry and reducing investment in heavy industry. Agricultural production was stimulated in 1979 by an increase of over 22 percent in the procurement prices paid for farm products.

Economist Thomas Rawski summarized China's economic development from 1957 to 1979, writing that "a nation that until 1957 could not manufacture tractors, power plants, or wristwatches now produces computers, earth satellites, oral contraceptives, and nuclear weapons. The technical skills required for industrial development are no longer confined within a few isolated urban enclaves."

The central policies of the reform program were introduced experimentally during the readjustment period. The most successful reform policy, the household responsibility system in agriculture, began development in 1979 as a way for poor rural units in mountainous or arid areas to increase their incomes. This system, which came to replace collective farming, maintained public ownership of land and some of the means of production, but made production the responsibility of households. Households still had to contribute to state quotas but could make their own decisions about what to plant on contracted land and could sell via a multi-tier price system that included the lowest price for payment to the state up until the quota, a higher rate for above-quota sales to the state, and market price for crops allowed to be sold at fairs. This multi-tier price system also resulted in price stabilization effects that encouraged production while protecting households from a decrease in market prices caused by the production boom. By 1983, the responsibility system was adopted by numerous farm units in all sorts of areas.

Agricultural production was also stimulated by official encouragement to establish free farmers' markets in urban areas, as well as in the countryside, and by allowing some families to operate as "specialized households," devoting their efforts to producing a scarce commodity or service on a profit-making basis.

In July 1979, China adopted its first Law on Joint Venture Using Chinese and Foreign Investment. This law was effective in helping to attract and absorb foreign technology and capital from advanced countries like the United States, facilitated China's exports to such countries, and thereby contributed to China's subsequent rapid economic growth.

Wage reform was the initial phase of China's labor reform. It added bonus pay to increase workers' material incentives and in 1979-1980 introduced the piece-wage system. Management positions modeled after western conventions were established in state enterprises with additional pay commensurate to rank, thereby increasing internal wage disparities. Management officials also were given the authority to pay workers (instead of wage funds being distributed by the state). Distribution of wages by management instead of the state abolished China's eight-grade wage scale, which had ensured that workers of the same grade received the same wages in all state enterprises.

Reform and opening, beginning in 1982
The period of readjustment produced promising results, increasing incomes substantially; raising the availability of food, housing, and other consumer goods; and generating strong rates of growth in all sectors except heavy industry, which was intentionally restrained. On the strength of these initial successes, the reform program was broadened, and the leadership under Deng Xiaoping frequently remarked that China's basic policy was "reform and opening," that is, reform of the economic system and opening to foreign trade.

In agriculture the contract responsibility system was adopted as the organizational norm for the entire country, and the commune structure was largely dismantled. By the end of 1984, approximately 98 percent of all farm households were under the responsibility system, and all but a handful of communes had been dissolved. The communes' administrative responsibilities were turned over to township and town governments, and their economic roles were assigned to townships and villages. The role of free markets for farm produce was further expanded and, with increased marketing possibilities and rising productivity, farm incomes rose rapidly.

In industry the complexity and interrelation of production activities prevented a single, simple policy from bringing about the kind of dramatic improvement that the responsibility system achieved in agriculture. Nonetheless, a cluster of policies based on greater flexibility, autonomy, and market involvement significantly improved the opportunities available to most enterprises, generated high rates of growth, and increased efficiency. Enterprise managers gradually gained greater control over their units, including the right to hire and fire, although the process required endless struggles with bureaucrats and party cadres. The practice of remitting taxes on profits and retaining the balance became universal by 1985, increasing the incentive for enterprises to maximize profits and substantially adding to their autonomy. A change of potentially equal importance was a shift in the source of investment funds from government budget allocations, which carried no interest and did not have to be repaid, to interest-bearing bank loans. As of 1987 the interest rate charged on such loans was still too low to serve as a check on unproductive investments, but the mechanism was in place.

The role of foreign trade under the economic reforms increased far beyond its importance in any previous period. Before the reform period, the combined value of imports and exports had seldom exceeded 10 percent of national income. In 1969 it was 15 percent, in 1984 it was 21 percent, and in 1986 it reached 35 percent. Unlike earlier periods, when China was committed to trying to achieve self-sufficiency, under Deng Xiaoping foreign trade was regarded as an important source of investment funds and modern technology. As a result, restrictions on trade were loosened further in the mid-1960s, and foreign investment was legalized. The most common foreign investments were joint ventures between foreign firms and Chinese units. Sole ownership by foreign investors also became legal, but the feasibility of such undertakings remained questionable.

The most conspicuous symbols of the new status of foreign trade were the four coastal special economic zones (see Glossary), which were created in 1979 as enclaves where foreign investment could receive special treatment. Three of the four zones—the cities of Shenzhen, Zhuhai, and Shantou—were located in Guangdong Province, close to Hong Kong. The fourth, Xiamen, in Fujian Province, was directly across the strait from Taiwan. More significant for China's economic development was the designation in April 1984 of economic development zones in the fourteen largest coastal cities- -including Dalian, Tianjin, Shanghai, and Guangzhou—all of which were major commercial and industrial centers. These zones were to create productive exchanges between foreign firms with advanced technology and major Chinese economic networks.

Domestic commerce also was stimulated by the reform policies, which explicitly endeavored to enliven the economy by shifting the primary burden of the allocation of goods and services from the government plan to the market. Private entrepreneurship and free-market activities were legalized and encouraged in the 1980s, although the central authorities continuously had to fight the efforts of local government agencies to impose excessive taxes on independent merchants.

A significant economic debate during this period concerned the approach to price liberalization and whether China should adopt an approach consistent with shock therapy—sudden price liberalization—or a more gradual approach. But in 1986, the latter approach won out. "Confronted with the diverse, authoritative warnings about the unforeseeable risks of imposing the shock of price reform and the uncertainty about its benefits" Premier Zhao Ziyang and the leadership ultimately rejected shock price reform. Zhao had accepted the argument that the basic concern in economic reform was energizing enterprises. By late summer, what started under the rubric of "coordinated comprehensive package reform" had been diluted to an adjustment in the price of steel (although its price was both important had carried symbolic weight) as well as partial tax and financial reform.

In 1986, the Contract Labor Law was passed, increasing management's power. Newly hired workers had to sign year-to-year contracts, with the goal of the policy being to reduce and eventually eliminate permanent employment for state employees.

By 1987 the state-owned system of commercial agencies and retail outlets coexisted with a rapidly growing private and collectively owned system that competed with it vigorously, providing a wider range of consumption choices for Chinese citizens than at any previous time.

Although the reform program achieved impressive successes, it also gave rise to several serious problems. One problem was the challenge to party authority presented by the principles of free-market activity and professional managerial autonomy. Another difficulty was a wave of crime, corruption, and—in the minds of many older people—moral deterioration caused by the looser economic and political climate. The most fundamental tensions were those created by the widening income disparities between the people who were "getting rich" and those who were not and by the pervasive threat of inflation. These concerns played a role in the political struggle that culminated in party general secretary Hu Yaobang's forced resignation in 1987. Following Hu's resignation, the leadership engaged in an intense debate over the future course of the reforms and how to balance the need for efficiency and market incentives with the need for government guidance and control. The commitment to further reform was affirmed, but its pace, and the emphasis to be placed on macroeconomic and micro-economic levers, remained objects of caution.

Through 1987 and into early 1988, Zhao's reform agenda focused on combining enterprise contracting with coastal development efforts. In summer 1988, radical price reform again became on the agenda.  It provoked a dramatic reaction: inflation spiraled for the first time since the 1940s, and the announced push for price reforms precipitated panic buying, runs on the bank, and protests in opposition to the market reforms. By fall 1988, price liberalization plans were halted and leadership instead focused on price reform, austerity, and retrenchment.

Also in 1988, the Enterprise Law was passed. It gave enterprises the authority to make major production decisions (including dismissing workers). Following the law's passage, enterprises were leased from the state to management and became distinct legal entities. Workers in these formerly state-run enterprises lost the protections of being state employees.

Industry

Agriculture

By 1984, agricultural production had boomed following the institution of the household responsibility system, which replaced collective farming. Then-Premier Zhao Ziyang wrote in his memoirs that in the years following the institution of household responsibility system, “the energy that was unleashed … was magical, beyond what anyone could have imagined. A problem thought to be unsolvable had worked itself out in just a few years time … [B]y 1984, farmers actually had more grain than they could sell. The state grain storehouses were stacked full from the annual procurement program.” As the government raised prices for grain and cotton and stimulated the growth of township and village enterprises, household income surged and poverty decreased from 1980 to 1985. Life improved for billions of people in rural China.

The agricultural policies responsible for the boom also increased inequalities. Regions with fertile soil, transportation hubs, or big cities were far more able to take advantage of market opportunities.

In 1985, the agricultural sector employed about 63 percent of the labor force and its proportion of GNP was about 33 percent. There was low worker productivity because of scant supplies of agricultural machinery and other modern inputs. Most agricultural processes were still performed by hand. There was very small arable land area (just above 10 percent of total area, as compared with 22 percent in United States) in relation to the size of the country and population. There was intensive use of land; all fields produced at least one crop a year, and wherever conditions permitted, two or even three crops were grown annually, especially in the south. Grain was the most the important product, including rice, wheat, corn, sorghum, barley, and millet. Other important crops included cotton, jute, oil seeds, sugarcane, and sugar beets. Eggs were also a major product. Pork production increased steadily, and poultry and pigs were raised on family plots. Other livestock were relatively limited in numbers, except for sheep and goats, which grazed in large herds on grasslands of the Inner Mongolia Autonomous Region and the northwest. There was substantial marine and freshwater fishery. Timber resources were mainly located in the northeast and southwest, and much of the country was deforested centuries ago. A wide variety of fruits and vegetables were grown.

1990–2000

China's economy saw continuous real GDP growth of at least 5% since 1991. During a Chinese New Year visit to southern China in early 1992, China's paramount leader at the time Deng Xiaoping made a series of political pronouncements designed to give new impetus to and reinvigorate the process of economic reform. The 14th National Communist Party Congress later in the year backed up Deng's renewed push for market reforms, stating that China's key task in the 1990s was to create a "socialist market economy". Continuity in the political system but bolder reform in the economic system were announced as the hallmarks of the 10-year development plan for the 1990s.

In the early 1990s, economic challenges increased in rural China. Grain farming became unprofitable due to falling prices for staple crops relative to the cost of chemical fertilizers, water, electricity, and other necessary services.

In 1993, the National People's Congress adopted the landmark Corporation Law. It provides that in state owned enterprises, the state is no more than an investor and controller of stock and assets. Pursuant to the Corporation Law, private and foreign investment in such enterprises must be below 49%. The law also permitted state firms to declare bankruptcy in the event of business failure.

In 1996, the Chinese economy continued to grow at a rapid pace, at about 9.5%, accompanied by low inflation. The economy slowed for the next three years, influenced in part by the Asian Financial Crisis, with official growth of 8.9% in 1997, 7.8% in 1998 and 7.1% for 1999. From 1995 to 1999, inflation dropped sharply, reflecting tighter monetary policies and stronger measures to control food prices. The year 2000 showed a modest reversal of this trend. Gross domestic product in 2000 grew officially at 8.0% that year, and had quadrupled since 1978. In 1999, with its 1.25 billion people but a GDP of just $3,800 per capita (PPP), China became the second largest economy in the world after the US. According to several sources, China did not become the second largest economy until 2010.  However, according to Gallup polls many Americans rate China's economy as first.  Considering GDP per capita, this is far from accurate.  The United States remains the largest economy in the world.  However, the trend of China Rising is clear.

The Asian financial crisis affected China at the margin, mainly through decreased foreign direct investment and a sharp drop in the growth of its exports. China's nonconvertible capital account and its foreign exchange controls were decisive in limiting the impacts of the crisis. However, China faced slowing growth and rising unemployment based on internal problems, including a financial system burdened by huge amounts of bad loans, and massive layoffs stemming from aggressive efforts to reform its state-owned enterprises (SOEs).

Despite China's impressive economic development during the past two decades, reforming the state sector and modernizing the banking system remained major hurdles. Over half of China's state-owned enterprises were inefficient and reporting losses. However, SOEs which operated at a loss sometimes did so for complex reasons, including as a result of policies which deliberately imposed higher income tax and VAT on SOEs than on foreign joint and privates companies.

During the 15th National Congress of the Chinese Communist Party that met in September 1997, General secretary, President Jiang Zemin announced plans to sell, merge, or close the vast majority of SOEs in his call for increased "non-public ownership" (feigongyou or privatization in euphemistic terms). The 9th National People's Congress endorsed the plans at its March 1998 session.  In 2000, China claimed success in its three-year effort to make the majority of large state owned enterprises (SOEs) profitable. By that year, the state sector accounted for 47% of industrial assets, approximately 50% of government output, and accounted for one-third of urban employment.

From 2000

After its entry into the World Trade Organization (WTO) in 2001, China began pursuing export-led growth and became a key link in global supply chains. Its industrious and cheap labor also proved attractive to foreign investments. China accumulated large trade surpluses and foreign currency reserves, which greatly increased government resources.

By 2002, the profits of industrial state-owned enterprises had grown by 163.6%.

Following the CCP's Third Plenum, held in October 2003, Chinese legislators unveiled several proposed amendments to the state constitution. One of the most significant was a proposal to provide protection for private property rights. Legislators also indicated there would be a new emphasis on certain aspects of overall government economic policy, including efforts to reduce unemployment (now in the 8–10% range in urban areas), to re-balance income distribution between urban and rural regions, and to maintain economic growth while protecting the environment and improving social equity. The National People's Congress approved the amendments when it met in March 2004.

The Fifth Plenum in October 2005 approved the 11th Five-Year Economic Program (2006–2010) aimed at building a "socialist harmonious society" through more balanced wealth distribution and improved education, medical care, and social security. In March 2006, the National People's Congress approved the 11th Five-Year Program. The plan called for a relatively conservative 45% increase in GDP and a 20% reduction in energy intensity (energy consumption per unit of GDP) by 2010.

China's economy grew at an average rate of 10% per year during the period 1990–2004, the highest growth rate in the world. China's GDP grew 10.0% in 2003, 10.1%, in 2004, and even faster 10.4% in 2005 despite attempts by the government to cool the economy. China's total trade in 2006 surpassed $1.76 trillion, making China the world's third-largest trading nation after the U.S. and Germany. Such high growth is necessary if China is to generate the 15 million jobs needed annually—roughly the size of Ecuador or Cambodia—to employ new entrants into the job market.

On January 14, 2009, as confirmed by the World Bank the NBS published the revised figures for 2007 financial year in which growth happened at 13 percent instead of 11.9 percent (provisional figures). China's gross domestic product stood at US$3.4 trillion while Germany's GDP was US$3.3 trillion for 2007. This made China the world's third largest economy by gross domestic product. Based on these figures, in 2007 China recorded its fastest growth since 1994 when the GDP grew by 13.1 percent. China may have already overtaken Germany even earlier as China's informal economy (including the Grey market and underground economy) is larger than Germany's. Louis Kuijs, a senior economist at World Bank China Office in Beijing, said that China's economy may even be (as of January 2009) as much as 15 percent larger than Germany's. According to Merrill Lynch China economist Ting Lu, China is projected to overtake Japan in "three to four years".

Social and economic indicators have improved since various recent reforms were launched, but rising inequality is evident between the more highly developed coastal provinces and the less developed, poorer inland regions. According to UN estimates in 2007, around 130 million people in China—mostly in rural areas of the lagging inland provinces—still lived in poverty, on subsistence wages of less than $1 a day. About 35% of the Chinese population lives under $2 a day.

In the medium-term, economists state that there is ample amount of potential for China to maintain relatively high economic growth rates and is forecasted to be the world's largest exporter by 2010. Urbanization in China and technological progress and catch-up with developed countries have decades left to run. But future growth is complicated by a rapidly aging population and costs of damage to the environment.

China launched its Economic Stimulus Plan to specifically deal with the Global financial crisis of 2008–2009. It primarily focused on increasing affordable housing, easing credit restrictions for mortgage and SMEs, lower taxes such as those on real estate sales and commodities, pumping more public investment into infrastructure development, such as the rail network, roads and ports. These effort both helped stabilize the global economy and also provided an opportunity for China to retool its own infrastructure. Continued economic growth during the crisis increased China's confidence in its model of development and convinced elites that the global balance of power was shifting. China increased its standing as a responsible global actor during the crisis.

Major natural disasters of 2008, such as the 2008 Chinese winter storms, the 2008 Sichuan earthquake, and the 2008 South China floods mildly affected national economic growth but did do major damage to local and regional economies and infrastructure. Growth rates for Sichuan dropped to 4.6% in the 2nd quarter but recovered to 9.5% annual growth for the whole of 2008. Major reconstruction efforts are still continuing after the May 12 earthquake, and are expected to last for at least three years. Despite closures and relocation of some factories because of the 2008 Summer Olympics, the games had a minor impact on Beijing's overall economic growth. The Chinese economy is significantly affected by the 2008-9 global financial crisis due to the export oriented nature of the economy which depends heavily upon international trade. However, government economic-stimulus has been hugely successful by nearly all accounts.

Corporate income tax (CIT): The income tax for companies is set at 25%, although there are some exceptions. When companies invest in industries supported by the Chinese government tax rates are only 15%. Companies that are investing in these industries also get other advantages.

In the online realm, China's e-commerce industry has grown more slowly than the EU and the US, with a significant period of development occurring from around 2009 on-wards. According to Credit Suisse, the total value of online transactions in China grew from an insignificant size in 2008 to around RMB 4 trillion (US$660 billion) in 2012. Alipay has the biggest market share in China with 300 million users and control of just under half of China's online payment market in February 2014, while Tenpay's share is around 20 percent, and China UnionPay's share is slightly greater than 10 percent.

According to the 2013 Corruption Perception Index, compiled by global coalition Transparency International, China is ranked 80 out of 177 countries, with a score of 40. The Index scores countries on a scale of 0 (highly corrupt) to 100 (very low corruption) and over half of the nations in the Asia Pacific region emerged with a score lower than 40. Transparency International stated in its final assessment:

If genuine efforts are to be made, the present efforts of the Chinese government should go beyond observing the rule of law. They should embrace political reforms that would allow checks and balances, transparency and independent scrutiny together with acknowledging the role that the civil society can play in countering corruption.During the Xi Jinping era, the Chinese government continues to use SOEs to serve non-market objectives and CCP control of SOEs has increased while taking some limited steps towards market liberalization, such as increasing mixed ownership of SOEs.

China's was the only major world economy to experience GDP growth in 2020, when its GDP increased by 2.3%. In 2021, China's GDP growth reached 8.1% (its highest in a decade) and its trade surplus reached an all-time high $687.5 billion.

Prices

Determination of prices
Until the reform period of the late 1970s and 1980s, the prices of most commodities were set by government agencies and changed infrequently. Because prices did not change when production costs or demand for a commodity altered, they often failed to reflect the true values of goods, causing many kinds of goods to be misallocated and producing a price system that the Chinese government itself referred to as "irrational."

Inflation
One of the most striking manifestations of economic instability in China in the 1930s and 1940s was runaway inflation. Inflation peaked during the Chinese civil war of the late 1940s, when wholesale prices in Shanghai increased 7.5 million times in the space of 3 years. In the early 1950s, stopping inflation was a major government objective, accomplished through currency reform, unification and nationalization of the banks, and tight control over prices and the money supply. These measures were continued until 1979, and China achieved a remarkable record of price stability. Price increases from the 1950s to the 1970s were generally minimal, although the periods of the Great Leap Forward and the Great Famine were notable exceptions. For example, between 1952 and 1978, retail prices for consumer goods grew at an average rate of only 0.6 percent a year. During the Mao era, "China had one of the most stable fiat currencies in modern times."

See also
 Chinese economic reform
 The Chinese Economy: Transitions and Growth (1949–present)
 Economic history of China before 1912
 Economy of China
 Globalization in China
 Historical GDP of China
 Special economic zones of China

References

 Attribution

Further reading

 Bardhan, Pranab. Awakening Giants, Feet of Clay: Assessing the Economic Rise of China and India (Princeton University Press; 2010) 172 pages
 Fengbo Zhang : Analysis of Chinese Macroeconomy
 Chow, Gregory C. China's Economic Transformation (2nd ed. 2007) excerpt and text search
 Das, Dilip K. China and the Asian Economies: Interactive Dynamics, Synergy and Symbiotic Growth (2013) excerpt and text search
 Feenstra, Robert C., and Shang-Jin Wei, eds. China's Growing Role in World Trade (University of Chicago Press; 2010) 608 pages; studies of the microstructure of trade, sector-level issues, and foreign direct investment.
Kadochnikov, Denis V.  (2019) Fiscal decentralization and regional budgets’ changing roles: a comparative case study of Russia and China, Area Development and Policy, DOI: 10.1080/23792949.2019.1705171
 McElderry, Andrea Lee, Jane Kate Leonard, and Robert Gardella. Chinese Business History: Interpretive Trends and Priorities for the Future (1998)
 Naughton, Barry. The Chinese Economy: Transitions and Growth (2007), important new survey
 Oi, Jean C. Rural China Takes Off: Institutional Foundations of Economic Reform, U of California Press, (1999) complete text online free
 Qiang, Gao and Yu Yi. The Wealth of China: Untangling the Mystery of the World's Second Largest Economy (2014) excerpt
 Yueh, Linda. The Economy of China (2010)  excerpt and text search
 Zhang, Shu Guang. Beijing’s Economic Statecraft during the Cold War, 1949-1991 (2014). online review

 
Contemporary history by country